An Education is a 2009 coming-of-age drama film based on a memoir of the same name by British journalist Lynn Barber. The film was directed by Lone Scherfig from a screenplay by Nick Hornby. It stars Carey Mulligan as Jenny, a bright schoolgirl, and Peter Sarsgaard as David, the charming conman who seduces her. The film was nominated for 3 Academy Awards in 2010: Best Picture, Best Adapted Screenplay for Nick Hornby, and Best Actress for Carey Mulligan.

An Education premiered at the 2009 Sundance Film Festival. It screened on 10 September 2009 at the Toronto International Film Festival and was featured at the Telluride by the Sea Film Festival in Portsmouth, New Hampshire, on 19 September 2009.<ref>"Telluride by the Sea" . SeaCoastOnline.com. Retrieved 31 March 2011.</ref> The film was shown on 9 October 2009, at the Mill Valley Film Festival. It was released in the US on 16 October 2009 and in the UK on 30 October 2009.

Plot
In 1961 London, Jenny Mellor is a bright and beautiful 16-year-old schoolgirl who wishes to attend Oxford University. Her studies are controlled by her strict, overbearing father, Jack. After youth orchestra rehearsals, Jenny waits at a bus stop on the street in the rain when she meets David Goldman, a seductive older man driving a Bristol 405. Telling her that he is a music lover and that he is worried about her cello getting wet, David convinces Jenny to put her cello in his car while she walks alongside. As the rain becomes stronger, Jenny asks David if she can sit inside his car. The two continue talking about music and, before being dropped off, Jenny confesses that she will be able to do whatever she wants when she reaches university, such as going to art galleries and watching French films, wishing for a life of culture and luxury. The following week, David leaves flowers on Jenny's front porch, wishing her luck at her youth orchestra's concert. Later, she sees him outside the cafe she and her friends are in and approaches him. After a little small talk, David asks Jenny if she is free to go see a concert and have supper with him and his friends. She happily agrees and thanks him.

On the night of the concert, Jack disapproves of Jenny going while her much more lenient mother, Marjorie, tells him otherwise. David comes by to pick Jenny up and to talk to her parents, where he easily charms his way into convincing Jack that he take Jenny home later than her intended curfew. They arrive at the concert where Jenny meets David's friends, Danny and Helen. Afterward, they go to dinner at a fancy restaurant, where they invite Jenny to an art auction. David picks up Jenny at school and they go to the auction, winning a bid for a painting by Edward Burne-Jones and going to Danny's place afterwards. They talk about Oxford and they all agree to go and visit together the following weekend.

Jenny hears a commotion late one night and sees David drinking with her parents. He then uses the opportunity to ask them if he can take Jenny to Oxford, saying that he used to study there and would like to visit his old teacher, Clive Lewis, the author of The Chronicles of Narnia. Her parents are reluctant at first, but agree, seeing it as a good opportunity. At Oxford, Jenny discovers that David is a con man who makes money through a variety of shady practices. She is initially shocked but silences her misgivings as she succumbs to David's charm. Back at her home, Jenny and David have their first kiss. Jenny then shows a signed copy of The Lion, the Witch and the Wardrobe to her parents, which David actually signed. Impressed by his connections and charisma, Jack and Marjorie approve of their romantic relationship.

On the night of Jenny's 17th birthday, David arrives with presents and tells her parents that he intends to take her to Paris as a special birthday gift. Her father angrily disapproves, but later agrees after David talks to him. In Paris, the two dance, take photos, and Jenny eventually loses her virginity to David. Back in London, Jenny gives her favorite teacher, Miss Stubbs, Chanel perfume as a gift from her trip. Miss Stubbs refuses the gift, telling Jenny that she knows where it came from and is both concerned and disapproving of her relationship with David. They argue and have a falling-out. Later that night, David proposes marriage. Jenny accepts the proposal and, after an argument with the headmistress, decides to drop out of school and not apply to university.

While getting petrol on their way to dinner with her parents, Jenny rummages through the car's glove compartment for a cigarette and discovers, through letters, that David is already married. Shocked, Jenny tells David to take her and her parents back home. Jenny argues with David, telling him she gave up her education to be with him. David says he will get a divorce and agrees that he will go and tell her parents the truth with her. She then goes inside her house, her father asking what happened. Jenny tells her parents that David is mustering up the courage before coming inside to confront them. However, he drives off and is never seen again.

Jenny despairs, blaming Danny and Helen for not telling her the truth early on and blaming her parents for letting her throw her life away with an older man. Jenny confronts David's wife, and learns that David is a serial adulterer, and has a son. Later that night, Jack apologizes to Jenny, admitting that he messed up and that he believed David could give her the life she wanted. Jack points out that although David wasn't who he said he was, Jenny had also deceived her parents about David's nature by playing along with some of David's lies to her parents. Jenny then goes back to her school, requesting to repeat her last year and take her exams, but is refused re-admission. She then goes to Miss Stubbs, asking for help. She resumes her studies and is accepted at Oxford the following year. In a closing voiceover, Jenny shares a story about dating boys her age and starting over with fresh eyes, despite her experiences with David.

Cast
 Carey Mulligan as Jenny Mellor
 Peter Sarsgaard as David Goldman
 Dominic Cooper as Danny, David's friend and partner in crime (Orlando Bloom was originally cast in this role but dropped out before shooting began).
 Rosamund Pike as Helen, Danny's girlfriend.
 Alfred Molina as Jack Mellor, Jenny's father.
 Cara Seymour as Marjorie Mellor, Jenny's mother.
 Emma Thompson as Miss Walters, the headmistress at Jenny's school.
 Olivia Williams as Miss Stubbs, Jenny's concerned teacher.
 Sally Hawkins as Sarah Goldman, David's wife.
 Matthew Beard as Graham, a boy Jenny knows from the Youth Orchestra.
 Ellie Kendrick as Tina, Jenny's friend from school.
 Ashley Rice as Petrol Attendant

Production
Development

Nick Hornby created the screenplay based on an autobiographical essay by the British journalist Lynn Barber about her schoolgirl affair with conman Simon Prewalski, referred to by her as Simon Goldman, which was published in the literary magazine Granta (82: Life's Like That, Summer 2003)."An Education" by Lynn Barber, Granta 82: Life's Like That. Published Summer 2003. Pages 203–223. Hornby was the boyfriend of Amanda Posey, the film's producer, whom he later married.

Both the memoir and the film also allude briefly to Peter Rachman, the notorious post-World War II London property speculator, who Goldman is working for.  Barber's full memoir, An Education, was not published in book form until June 2009, when filming had already been completed. Hornby said that what appealed to him in the memoir was that "She's a suburban girl who's frightened that she's going to get cut out of everything good that happens in the city. That, to me, is a big story in popular culture. It's the story of pretty much every rock 'n' roll band." Although the screenplay involved Hornby writing about a teenage girl, he did not feel it was more challenging than writing any other character: "I think the moment you're writing about somebody who's not exactly you, then the challenge is all equal. I was glad that everyone around me on this movie was a woman so that they could watch me carefully. But I don't remember anyone saying to me, 'That isn't how women think.'"

Visual style
Although Jenny's family home is supposed to be in the suburb of Twickenham, Middlesex (incorrectly referred to as 'Twickenham, London' – Twickenham did not become part of Greater London until 1965), the residential scenes featured in the film were shot on Carbery Avenue in the Gunnersbury area of Ealing, west London as well as Mattock Lane in West Ealing and The Japanese School in Acton, which used to be the site of the girls' school called Haberdashers' Aske's School for Girls.  The concert hall shown in the film, St John's, Smith Square would have still been a wartime ruin at the time the film was set. It was subsequently restored and opened as a concert hall in October 1969.

Release

Critical response
On Rotten Tomatoes, the film has an approval rating of 93% based on 197 reviews, with an average rating of 7.9/10. The site's consensus reads: "Though the latter part of the film may not appeal to all, An Education is a charming coming-of-age tale powered by the strength of former newcomer Carey Mulligan's standout performance." The film has a Metacritic score of 85/100 based on 34 reviews, indicating "universal acclaim".

Box officeAn Education grossed £1,633,504 in the UK. and $US26,096,852 worldwide.

AccoladesAn Education won the Audience Choice award and the Cinematography award at the 2009 Sundance Film Festival. Mulligan won a Hollywood Film Festival award for Best Hollywood Breakthrough Performance for a Female.
It was selected as Sight & Sound's film of the month.

The film received three nominations at the 82nd Academy Awards: Best Picture, Best Actress for Carey Mulligan and Best Adapted Screenplay, but did not win in any category. The 63rd British Academy Film Awards saw the film come away with one award (for Best Actress) from nine nominations. The film received six British Independent Film Awards nominations and five Satellite Awards nominations.

Home mediaAn Education'' was released on DVD and Blu-ray on 30 March 2010.

Theatrical play 
The first adaptation of the screenplay to live theatre was staged at the University of St Andrews in 2019 at the annual On the Rocks Festival.

References

External links

 
 
 
 Lynn Barber's own account

2009 films
2000s coming-of-age drama films
2000s teen drama films
BAFTA winners (films)
British coming-of-age films
British teen drama films
Adultery in films
Films about virginity
Films set in 1961
Films set in London
Films shot in London
Films shot in Oxfordshire
Juvenile sexuality in films
University of Oxford in fiction
Independent Spirit Award for Best Foreign Film winners
Films directed by Lone Scherfig
Films with screenplays by Nick Hornby
2009 drama films
Sony Pictures Classics films
2000s English-language films
2000s British films